Copper Creek can refer to several streams:

Copper Creek (Valdez-Cordova Borough, Alaska) (several with that name)
Copper Creek (Denali Borough, Alaska)
Copper Creek (California)
Copper Creek (Washington)
Copper Creek (Wisconsin), a stream in Sauk County